Gateway Worship is an American Christian worship band from Dallas-Fort Worth, Texas. The team leads worship at Gateway Church, a 39,000 member congregation located in Southlake, Texas, which has grown quickly since the church's beginnings in 2000. Gateway Worship is made of a whole team of worshippers who serve Gateway.  Thomas Miller served as the original senior worship pastor until becoming executive ministry pastor in 2018. He was succeeded by Mark Harris, formerly of 4Him. Harris leads a team of worship pastors including, David Moore, Matt Birkenfeld, Zach Neese, Aaron Crider, Jason Tam, Tim Sheppard, Jessica Sheppard, Levi Smith, Austin Benjamin.

Gateway Worship is currently signed with Gateway Create Publishing, Fair Trade Services, and Integrity Music.

The group's 2008 release Wake Up the World reached No. 2 on the Billboard Top Christian Albums chart.

Gateway's live album, Walls, was released on October 2, 2015 and reached No. 1 on Billboards Top Christian Albums Chart.

Discography 
Gateway Worship's discography includes live albums and studio albums.

Live albums

Studio albums 
 Unsearchable (2003)
 My Beloved (2009)
 (Songs Inspired By) Conversations with God (2009)
 The More I Seek You (2011)
 Gateway Worship Voices (2016)
 Monuments (2017)

Gateway Devotions albums 
The album titles are taken from various sermon series led by Robert Morris, Founding Senior Pastor.
 Drawing Closer: Songs from Gateway Devotions (2006)
 The Battle: Songs from Gateway Devotions (2007)
 First: Songs from Gateway Devotions (2008)
 Let's Go: Songs from Gateway Devotions (2010)
 In Jesus Name: Songs from Gateway Devotions (2012)
 Love Expressed: Songs from Gateway Devotions (2013)
 It Is Written: Songs from Gateway Devotions (2014)
 The Blessed Life: Songs from Gateway Devotions (2015)
 The God I Never Knew: Songs from Gateway Devotions (2016)
 Waiting on a Whisper: Songs from Gateway Devotions (2017)

Compilation albums 
 The First 10 Years (2013)
 Voices: Kari Jobe (2016)
 Voices: Thomas Miller (2016)

Gateway Choir albums 
 We Cry Out (2016)

Gateway Kids Worship albums 
 Look Up (as Gateway Next) (2012)
 Ready to Go (as Gateway Next) (2013)
 Heartbeat (EP) (2016)
 Believe It (2018)
 Todos Mis Dias (2020)

Gateway Generate albums 
 Gateway Generate (EP) (2013)

Spanish albums 
 El Señor Reina (2013)
 Gloria a Dios (2014)
 Por Siempre Tuyo (2016)
 Murallas (2017)
 Mas Grande (2018)
 Grande y Fiel (2022)

Portuguese albums 
 Glória a Deus (2012)
 Deus Reina (2015)
 Pra Sempre Teu (2016)
 Muralhas (2017)

Notes

References 
"Gateway Worship Bio". Published by Integrity Media. Retrieved 2008-08-01.
"Gateway Worship: About Us". Published by Gateway Church. Retrieved 2008-08-01.
"Review on Soul-Audio.com". Written by Cindy Poch. 2008-08-01.
"Review on Christianity Today". Written by Andree Farias. 2008-08-01

External links 
 

Musical groups established in 2003
People from Southlake, Texas
Christian musical groups
American Christian musical groups
Musical groups from Texas
American gospel musical groups
Performers of contemporary worship music